A penumbral lunar eclipse took place on Friday, August 4, 1944.

Visibility

Related lunar eclipses

See also 
List of lunar eclipses and List of 21st-century lunar eclipses

External links 
 Saros series 147
 

1944-08
1944 in science